John T. McGlone (1864–1927) was a professional baseball player from 1886–1888. He played in the minors through 1894.

External links

1864 births
1927 deaths
Sportspeople from Brooklyn
Baseball players from New York City
Major League Baseball third basemen
Baseball players from New York (state)
Cleveland Blues (1887–88) players
Washington Nationals (1886–1889) players
19th-century baseball players
Buffalo Bisons (minor league) players
Rochester Maroons players
Detroit Wolverines (minor league) players
Toronto Canucks players
Denver Grizzlies (baseball) players
Denver Mountaineers players
Minneapolis Millers (baseball) players
Omaha Lambs players
Binghamton Bingos players
Rochester Flour Cities players
Troy Trojans (minor league) players
Bangor Millionaires players
Pawtucket Maroons players
Lewiston (minor league baseball) players
Worcester (minor league baseball) players
Burials at Holy Cross Cemetery, Brooklyn